Bezirk Steyr-Land is a district of the state of 
Upper Austria in Austria.

Municipalities 
Towns (Städte) are indicated in boldface; market towns (Marktgemeinden) in italics; suburbs, hamlets and other subdivisions of a municipality are indicated in small characters.
Adlwang
Aschach an der Steyr
Bad Hall
Dietach
Gaflenz
Garsten
Großraming
Laussa
Losenstein
Maria Neustift
Pfarrkirchen bei Bad Hall
Reichraming
Rohr im Kremstal
Schiedlberg
Sierning
Sankt Ulrich bei Steyr
Ternberg
Waldneukirchen
Weyer
Wolfern

External links 
 Official site

 
Districts of Upper Austria